The striped flowerpecker (Dicaeum aeruginosum) is a species of bird in the family Dicaeidae. It is endemic to the Philippines. Its natural habitats are subtropical or tropical moist lowland forest and subtropical or tropical moist montane forest.
It is sometimes considered conspecific with the thick-billed flowerpecker.

References

striped flowerpecker
Endemic birds of the Philippines
striped flowerpecker
striped flowerpecker
striped flowerpecker
Taxonomy articles created by Polbot
Taxobox binomials not recognized by IUCN